Tomáš Šilhavý (born 3 January 1981) is a Czech footballer, who played in the Czech First League for Slavia Prague. Now he playing at 3rd league. He is the son of the record-holder of the most number of league starts, Jaroslav Šilhavý.

References

External links
 
 
 

1981 births
Living people
Czech footballers
Association football defenders
Czech Republic under-21 international footballers
Czech First League players
SK Slavia Prague players
FK Chmel Blšany players
FK Ústí nad Labem players
FC Sellier & Bellot Vlašim players